Delma molleri (commonly known as Gulfs delma and Adelaide delma) is a small [the snout-vent length of the largest specimen measured ], limbless lizard found in southern South Australia around the Adelaide Hills, and pretty common in Adelaide suburbs.  Delma molleri has been recorded from a variety of habitats ranging from grassland to woodland beneath rocks, timber, and rubbish. The species is oviparous.

The nucleotide (DNA/RNA) and protein sequences of D. molleri have been sourced through the European Nucleotide Archive (ENA) and Universal Protein Resource (UniProt) databases.  The identification of the species as an Australian-dwelling organism has been achieved by accessing the Australian Plant Census (APC) and the Australian Faunal Directory (AFD) through the Atlas of Living Australia.

Etymology
The specific name, molleri, is in honor of Danish ship's captain Möller who brought the holotype from Australia.

References

Sources
Books

Beolens, Bo; Watkins, Michael; Grayson, Michael (2011). The Eponym Dictionary of Reptiles. Baltimore: Johns Hopkins University Press. xiii + 296 pp. .
 
 
 
 

Journals and magazines

 
 

Web

molleri
Pygopodids of Australia
Endemic fauna of Australia
Taxa named by Christian Frederik Lütken
Reptiles described in 1863